Emil's Mischiefs (– "Tricks of a Rascal") is a 1985 Latvian TV-film about the Astrid Lindgren character, Emil i Lönneberga. It was produced by Riga Film Studio.

The film was awarded the Latvian National Film Prize Lielais Kristaps in 1985.

External links
 Emīla nedarbi on the website of Latvian Television. 
 About the making of Emīla nedarbi, from www.filmas.lv 
 

Latvian comedy films
1985 films
Soviet comedy films
Soviet-era Latvian films
Films based on Emil of Lönneberga
Riga Film Studio films